Punnagavarali, a raga in Carnatic Music, is a derived scale from Hanumatodi, which is the 8th melakarta Raga in the 72 melakarta system.

Punnagavarali raga is associated with karuna rasa and snakes (naga means snake). Snake charmers play this scale. In wedding ceremonies, a piece called the Odam usually played at the muhurtam, is often in Punnagavarali. This is an ancient raga and traditional Tamil pieces such as Nondichindu are also set in this.

Structure and lakshana
Punnagavarali is a nishadantya raga (starts and ends in a single octave, nishada to nishada) and is hence usually presented in the madhyama sruti. In the ascent the chatusruti rishabha also occurs, sometimes. The raga's regal presence is best felt in slow phrases.

The notes include kaisiki nishada, sadja, suddha rishabha, sadharana gandhara, suddha madhyama, pancama and suddha dhaivata. Its  structure is as follows (see swaras in Carnatic music for details on below notation and terms):

ArOhaNam: 
avarOhaNAm:

Compositions
Some of the popular compositions are listed below.
Muthuswami Dikshitar's Ehi annapoorney set to Adi tala and Kamalambikaya sthavabhakthoham set to Rupakam tala
Thyagaraja's Utsava sampradaya kriti "Thavadhasoham", and the Divyanama Sankeertanas- "Gandhamu Puyyaruga" and "Dasaradha Nandana"
Syama Sastri's Kankashaila Viharini and Brovasamayamu 
Papanasam Sivan's "Shiva Ganga Nagaranivasini"
Agastya's 2nd line of "Sri Chakra Raja"

Related Raga
Punnagavarali has some resemblance to Nadanamakriya.

Film Songs

Language:Tamil 

•Thekkumkooradiyaathi	(Ashwamedham	1967)
•Enthucheyyendu	(Thuruppugulaan	1972)
•Aadiyushassil	(Manushyan	1979)	

•Manikkuyile	(Vaalkkannaadi	2002)
•Paalkkadalil pallikollum (Goureeshankaram 2003)
•Sundarana (D)	(Kanaka Simhaasanam	2006)
•Dukhathinundoru	(Naadabrahmam 2011)

Oo Antava From movie Puspha: The Rise is also based on this raga

See also

 List of Film Songs based on Ragas

Notes

References

External links

Janya ragas